Office of the Chief Executive is the office building for the Chief Executive of Hong Kong. It is located at 1 Tim Wa Avenue in Admiralty on Hong Kong Island, Hong Kong SAR. It is one of the buildings in the Tamar Development Project. East of its location is the Legislative Council Complex; on the south is Central Government Complex. The open space between these three building are preserve as Tamar Park.

The Office of the Chief Executive started operating on 8 August 2011. Before that, the office was operated in Government House in Central.

Nearby
Central Government Complex
Legislative Council Complex
Tamar Park

See also
Office of the Chief Executive: A government agencies for the Hong Kong Chief Executive.
Government House, Hong Kong SAR

References

External links
 

Admiralty, Hong Kong
Government buildings in Hong Kong